Gunfighter: The Legend of Jesse James is a shooter video game developed by Rebellion Developments and published by Ubi Soft for the PlayStation. The game's plot is set in the American Old West. And this game's main character is Jesse James, a 19th century American outlaw.

Gameplay
The game takes inspiration from Namco's Time Crisis and is set in the Wild West. The player must defeat all onscreen enemies in an area in order to move to the next area. The player is allowed to hide in order to dodge enemy attacks. However, the player must defeat all enemies before an onscreen timer expires. Sometimes, the player is rewarded for clearing an area with a time extension.

Sequel
Gunfighter II: Revenge of Jesse James, a sequel to Gunfighter: The Legend of Jesse James, was developed by Rebellion Developments and published by Ubisoft in Europe in 2003.

Reception

The game received "mixed" reviews according to the review aggregation website Metacritic.

References

External links
 

2001 video games
PlayStation (console) games
PlayStation (console)-only games
Western (genre) video games
Ubisoft games
Light gun games
Rebellion Developments games
Video games developed in the United Kingdom